"Make This Love Right" (more commonly known as "The Ball and Chain"), is a single written and produced by New Jersey garage house producer Romanthony. The song was originally released on Black Male Records of New Jersey in 1991 and released on Azuli Records in 1993. The song was something of an anomalous cultural craze in the city of Cork, Republic of Ireland, in the late 1990s where it became an anthem for club goers. Copies of the record were routinely sold for close to IE£100 (€127) in the city and it received extensive air-play on mainstream local radio and in nightclubs.

The nickname for the record comes from the prominent lines in the song:

Such was the demand for the record in Cork that a special repress was made in the year 2000.

References

1991 songs
1991 singles
1993 singles